The 2022 Fitchburg State Falcons football team represented Fitchburg State University as a member of the Massachusetts State Collegiate Athletic Conference (MASCAC) during the 2022 NCAA Division III football season. The Falcons, were originally led by 2nd-year head coach Scott Sperone before he was fired and replaced by Mark Sullivan, played their home games at Elliot Field in Fitchburg, Massachusetts.

Previous season

The Falcons finished the 2021 season with a record of 0–10 (0–8 in the MASCAC), which finished in last-place.

Schedule

Game summaries

Dean

Personnel

Coaching staff

Roster

References

Fitchburg State
Fitchburg State Falcons football seasons
Fitchburg State Falcons football